Christmas, Thanks for Nothing is a Christmas EP by British folk-duo Slow Club, released on 14 December 2009.

Track listing

References 

Slow Club albums
Moshi Moshi Records albums
2009 EPs
2009 Christmas albums
Christmas albums by English artists
Christmas EPs
Folk Christmas albums